The Burmese bush lark (Mirafra microptera) or Burmese lark, is a species of lark in the family Alaudidae found in Southeast Asia.

Taxonomy and systematics 
The Burmese bush lark was formerly considered as a subspecies of the Bengal bush lark until split following work published by Per Alström.

Distribution and habitat 
Although the global population of the Burmese bush lark has not yet been quantified, it is believed to be locally numerous within its sizable range in central Myanmar, where it is endemic, and is estimated to have an extent of occurrence of anywhere from 50,000 to 100,000 km2.

The Burmese bush lark is a common denizen of a variety of habitats, including grasslands, fallow farm fields, sandy areas, and arable land, especially those with some trees and shrubs.

References

External links 

Species factsheet - BirdLife International

Burmese bush lark
Endemic birds of Myanmar
Burmese bush lark
Taxonomy articles created by Polbot